Rumble Strips may refer to:
 Rumble strip, the road safety feature
 The Rumble Strips, the British band